In Pursuit is a direct-to-video 2001 American film directed by Peter Pistor and written by John Penney, based on a story by Pistor.  The film was shot in Encino, California.

Plot

An attorney is accused of murdering a powerful man after having an affair with his beautiful wife.

Principal cast

References

External links 
 
 

2001 direct-to-video films
2001 films
American independent films
2000s English-language films
2000s American films